The Embassy of Romania in London is the diplomatic mission of Romania in the United Kingdom. Diplomatic relations between the two countries were established in 1880. The embassy is one of several located in Kensington Palace Gardens, at 4 Palace Green.

Romania also maintains a Consulate at 344 Kensington High Street, Holland Park and a Cultural Institute at 1 Belgrave Square, Belgravia.

Gallery

References

External links

Official site

Romania
Diplomatic missions of Romania
Romania–United Kingdom relations
Buildings and structures in the City of Westminster
Buildings and structures in the Royal Borough of Kensington and Chelsea
South Kensington